Maghe Sankranti is a Nepali festival observed on the first of Magh in the Vikram Sambat (B.S) or Yele calendar bringing an end to the winter solstice containing month of Poush. Tharu people celebrate this particular day as new year. It is also regarded as the major government declared annual festival of the Magar community. Maghe Sankranti is similar to solstice festivals in other religious traditions.

Observant Hindus take ritual baths during this festival. These include Sankhamul on the Bagmati near Patan; In the Gandaki/Narayani river basin at Triveni, Devghat near Chitwan Valley and Ridi on the Kaligandaki; and in the Koshi River basin at Dolalghat on the Sun Koshi. Festive foods like laddoo, ghee and sweet potatoes are distributed. Niece and Nephew usually go to Mama Ghar and take Tika and blessing/dakshina.

Date and Significance 
Generally maghe sankranti falls on 14 January, and also called Makar Sankranti or Maghi in the Indian subcontinent. Maghe Sankranti is a major harvest festival celebrated in Nepal. The movement of the sun from one zodiac sign into another is called Sankranti and as the Sun moves into the Capricorn zodiacal sign known as Makara, this occasion is named as Makara Sankranti in the Pahari context. It is one of the few Nepalese festivals of Madhesi and Tharu people  celebrate it on a fixed date, i.e., 14 January because this solar festival in the honor of deity Surya follows the solar cycle of the Bikrami calendar, unlike other festivals that follow lunar cycle.

Maghe Sankranti is regarded as marking the beginning of an auspicious phase in Nepalese culture. It is cited as the 'holy phase of transition'. It marks the end of an inauspicious phase which according to the Hindu calendar begins around mid-December. It is believed that any auspicious and sacred ritual can be sanctified in any Nepali family, this day on-wards. Scientifically, this day marks the beginning of warmer and longer days compared to the nights. In other words, Sankranti marks the termination of winter season and beginning of a new harvest or spring season.

All over the country, Maghe Sankranti is observed with great fanfares. However, it is celebrated with distinct names and rituals in different parts of the country. In the states of northern and western Nepal, the festival is celebrated as the Makar Sankranti day with special zeal and fervour. The importance of this day has been signified in the ancient epics like Mahabharata. So, apart from socio-geographical importance, Maghe Sankranti holds historical and religious significance. As it is the festival of Sun God, and he is regarded as the symbol of divinity and wisdom, the festival holds an eternal meaning.

Makar Sankranti and the Winter Solstice

Many Nepalese conflate this festival with the Winter Solstice, and believe that the sun ends its southward journey (Sanskrit: Dakshinayana) at the Tropic of Capricorn, and starts moving northward (Sanskrit: Uttarayana) towards the Tropic of Cancer, in the month of Poush on this day in mid-January.

While there is no overt solar observance of Winter Solstice in the Nepali religion, the Vaikuntha Ekadashi festival, calculated on the lunar calendar, falls the closest. Further, the Sun makes its northward journey on the day after winter solstice when day light increases. Therefore, Makar Sankranti signifies the celebration of the day following the day of winter solstice.

Scientifically, currently in the Northern Hemisphere, winter solstice occurs between 21 and 22 December. Day light will begin to increase on 22 December and on this day, the Sun will begin its northward journey which marks Uttarayaan. The date of winter solstice changes gradually due to the Axial precession of the Earth, coming earlier by approximately 1 day in every 70 years. Hence, if the Maghe Sankranti at some point of time did mark the day after the actual date of winter solstice, a date in mid-January would correspond to around 300CE, the heyday of Hellenic mathematics and astronomy, which was very influential in northern India.

See also 
 Vaikuntha Chaturdashi
 Makar Sankranti

References

External links 
 Information about festival
https://web.archive.org/web/20141228094441/http://www.ekantipur.com/the-kathmandu-post/2012/01/15/metro/maghe-sankranti-marked-feasting-on-food-varieties/230436.html
Maghe Sankranti In Nepal
Maharjan, S. (2011, January 6). Ghyah-Chāku Salhu (Māgha Sankrānti). NEPÆNGLISH. https://nepaenglish.com/2011/01/06/ghyah-chaku-salhu-magha-sankranti/
‌

Hindu festivals in Nepal
Nepalese culture
Culture of Mithila
Public holidays in Nepal
Hindu festivals
Hindu holy days
Observances set by the Vikram Samvat calendar
January observances
Tharu culture
Newar culture
Khas culture
Kirat festivals
Culture of Bagmati
Culture of Lumbini
Culture of Gandaki
Magar culture

mai:माघे सङ्क्रान्ति
ne:माघे सङ्क्रान्ति
new:घ्यःचाकु संल्हु